Aloe Plaza is a small park and plaza in St Louis, directly in front of Union Station; it is the western terminus of the St. Louis Gateway Mall.

Two city blocks in size, it is bounded by Market, Chestnut, 18th, and 20th streets, although an extension west of 20th Street is being built (as of 2022).

Construction of the plaza was enabled by a 1923 bond issue of 87 million dollars (about $ in  dollars). The bond issue was championed by St Louis politician Louis P. Aloe, for whom the plaza is named.

The Meeting of the Waters

Aloe Plaza is dominated by the large fountain The Meeting of the Waters, a St Louis landmark designed by Carl Milles, symbolizing the confluence of the Mississippi and Missouri Rivers. Two large figures represent the two rivers, and seventeen mythical creatures representing smaller tributaries adorn the fountain.

The Meeting of the Waters is Milles's best known American work. Edith Aloe, Louis P. Aloe’s widow, was instrumental in Meeting of the Waters being funded and commissioned. The statue was commissioned in 1936, completed in 1939, and unveiled on May 11, 1940.

The fountain met some criticism at first for its modernistic and irreverent features, and particularly for the nudity of the main figures (a male figure representing the Mississippi River and a female figure representing Missouri River). Milles had named the fountain The Wedding of the Waters and conceived the naked and playful figures as a wedding party. Local officials felt that a nudist wedding ceremony was offensive, and insisted that the name be changed to The Meeting of the Waters.

References

Parks in St. Louis
Geography of St. Louis
1931 establishments in Missouri
Tourist attractions in St. Louis